Club Life, Vol. 3 - Stockholm is a mixed compilation album by Dutch DJ/producer Tiësto. It is the third installment of his Club Life compilation series.

Track listing

Charts

Weekly charts

Year-end charts

References

2013 compilation albums
Tiësto compilation albums